Videx, Inc. is a Corvallis, Oregon manufacturer of computer hardware such as access control products and data collection terminals.

Its initial success came with the first release of the $345 Videoterm (80 column) display card in March 1980 and the $149 shift and custom keyboard mapping Enhancer II terminal card in November 1981, both for Apple II computers.  Later, in 1984, it released its $379 UltraTerm expansion card boasting high-definition 96-pixel characters and up to 128 × 32 character display. These products became obsolete when Apple released the Apple IIe with most of the 80-column card hardware built-in - only a much simpler and cheaper RAM card was then required.

Videx also produced software, including Desktop Calendar (1984) for the Apple Lisa.

References

External links
 

Computer hardware companies
Apple II peripherals